State Route 115 (SR 115) is a  state highway in Coosa County. The southern terminus of the highway is at an intersection with SR 9 in the eastern part of the county. The northern terminus is at an intersection with U.S. Route 280 (US 280) northwest of Alexander City in Kellyton.

Route description

SR 115 is routed along a two-lane roadway in southeastern Coosa County. It travels to the northeast from an intersection with SR 9 towards its northern terminus at US 280. The highway serves as a shortcut between SR 9 and US 280.

Major intersections

See also

References

External links

115
Transportation in Coosa County, Alabama